Wojtek (1942 – 2 December 1963; ; in English, sometimes phonetically spelled Voytek and pronounced as such) was a Syrian brown bear (Ursus arctos syriacus) bought, as a young cub, at a railway station in Hamadan, Iran, by Polish II Corps soldiers who had been evacuated from the Soviet Union. In order to provide for his rations and transportation, he was eventually enlisted officially as a soldier with the rank of private, and was subsequently promoted to corporal.

He accompanied the bulk of the II Corps to Italy, serving with the 22nd Artillery Supply Company. During the Battle of Monte Cassino, in Italy in 1944, Wojtek helped move crates of ammunition and became a celebrity with visiting Allied generals and statesmen. After the war he was mustered out of the Polish Army and lived out the rest of his life at the Edinburgh Zoo in Scotland.

Life

In the spring of 1942 the newly formed Anders' Army left the Soviet Union for Iran, accompanied by thousands of Polish civilians who had been deported to the Soviet Union following the 1939 Soviet invasion of eastern Poland. At a railroad station in Hamadan, Iran, on 8 April 1942, Polish soldiers encountered a young Iranian boy who had found a bear cub whose mother had been shot by hunters. One of the civilian refugees in their midst, eighteen-year-old Irena (Inka) Bokiewicz, the great-niece of General Bolesław Wieniawa-Długoszowski, was very taken with the cub. She prompted Lieutenant Anatol Tarnowiecki to buy the young bear, which spent the next three months in a Polish refugee camp established near Tehran, principally under Irena's care. In August, the bear was donated to the 2nd Transport Company, which later became the 22nd Artillery Supply Company, and he was named Wojtek by the soldiers. The name Wojtek is the nickname, diminutive form, or hypocorism of "Wojciech" (Happy Warrior), an old Slavic name still common in Poland.

Wojtek initially had problems swallowing and was fed condensed milk from an old vodka bottle. He was subsequently given fruit, marmalade, honey, and syrup, and was often rewarded with beer, which became his favourite drink. He later also enjoyed smoking (or eating) cigarettes, as well as drinking coffee in the mornings. He also slept with the other soldiers if they were ever cold at night. He enjoyed wrestling with the soldiers and was taught to salute when greeted. He became an attraction for soldiers and civilians alike, and soon became an unofficial mascot to all the units stationed nearby. With the 22nd Company, he moved to Iraq, and then through Syria, Palestine, and Egypt.

Wojtek copied the other soldiers, drinking beer, smoking and even marching alongside them on his hind legs because he saw them do so. Wojtek had his own caregiver, assigned to look after him.

Private Wojtek

From Egypt, the Polish II Corps was reassigned to fight alongside the British Eighth Army in the Italian campaign. Regulations for the British transport ship, which was to carry them to Italy, forbade mascot and pet animals. To get around this restriction, Wojtek was officially drafted into the Polish Army as a private and listed among the soldiers of the 22nd Artillery Supply Company. Henryk Zacharewicz and Dymitr Szawlugo were assigned as his caretakers.

As an enlisted soldier with his own paybook, rank, and serial number, he lived with the other men in tents or in a special wooden crate, which was transported by truck. During the Battle of Monte Cassino, Wojtek helped his unit to convey ammunition by carrying  crates of 25-pound artillery shells, never dropping any of them. While this story generated controversy over its accuracy, at least one account exists of a British soldier recalling seeing a bear carrying crates of ammo. The bear mimicked the soldiers: when he saw the men lifting crates, he copied them. Wojtek carried boxes that normally required four men, which he would stack onto a truck or other ammunition boxes. This service at Monte Cassino earned him promotion to the rank of corporal. In recognition of Wojtek's popularity, a depiction of a bear carrying an artillery shell was adopted as the official emblem of the 22nd Company.

Post war

After the end of World War II in 1945, Wojtek was transported to Berwickshire, Scotland, with the rest of the 22nd Company. They were stationed at Winfield Airfield on Sunwick Farm, near the village of Hutton, Scottish Borders. Wojtek soon became popular among local civilians and the press, and the Polish-Scottish Association made him an honorary member.

Following demobilisation on 15 November 1947, Wojtek was given to Edinburgh Zoo, where he spent the rest of his life, often visited by journalists and former Polish soldiers, some of whom tossed cigarettes for him to eat, as he did during his time in the army. He still happily responded to being spoken to in Polish, recognizing many of his former unit. Media attention contributed to Wojtek's popularity. He was a frequent guest on BBC television's Blue Peter programme for children.

Legacy 
 The many memorials to the soldier-bear include a plaque in the Imperial War Museum, in London; a sculpture by David Harding in the Sikorski Museum, in London; and a wooden sculpture in Weelsby Woods, Grimsby.
 In 2013, the Kraków city council gave permission for the erection of a statue of Wojtek in the city's Jordan Park. It was unveiled on 18 May 2014, the 70th anniversary of the Battle of Monte Cassino.
 In 2013, the City of Edinburgh Council approved the erection of a bronze statue of Wojtek, by Alan Beattie Herriot, to stand in the city's West Princes Street Gardens. Unveiled in 2015, it presents Wojtek and a fellow Polish Army soldier walking together. An accompanying relief documents Wojtek's journey from Egypt to Scotland with the Polish Army.
 In 2016 a statue of Wojtek was unveiled in Duns, in the Scottish Borders. Wojtek had been stationed at the nearby Winfield Camp in 1946, alongside Polish troops.  The statue was donated by the Polish town of Żagań, Duns' twin town, and was unveiled on 26 April 2016, 72 years after the Battle of Monte Cassino, which involved Polish forces, including Wojtek.
 In 2017 a street in Poznań, Poland was named after Wojtek. The street, now named Ulica Kaprala Wojtka ("Corporal Wojtek's Street) leads up to the Poznań New Zoo.
 In September 2018 a wooden statue of Wojtek was unveiled in the Poznań New Zoo, funded by Krystyna Wieczorek, the author of a Polish book about Wojtek. 
 In May 2019 a marble statue of Wojtek was unveiled in Cassino, Italy.

See also
History of Edinburgh Zoo
List of individual bears
Poles in the United Kingdom
Polish Armed Forces in the East
Polish Armed Forces in the West
Polish Resettlement Corps
Wojtek Memorial Trust
Winnipeg (bear)

References

Further reading

External links

 
WOJTEK: The unusual Polish soldier that drank beer and went to war.
 
 
  A group supporting and publicizing historical projects around the world.
  Site devoted to preserving the history into which Wojtek fits.
 
 
 
 One Photo One Story: Wojtek the Soldier Bear, Culture.pl.

1942 animal births
1963 animal deaths
Battle of Monte Cassino
Bear mascots
Edinburgh Zoo
Hamadan
Individual animals in Scotland
Individual bears
Military animals of World War II
Military history of Poland during World War II
Military of Scotland
Polish Land Forces
Polish military traditions
Individual animals in Iran
Individual animals in Poland